Antop Hill is a monorail station on Line 1 of the Mumbai Monorail locates near CGS Colony in the Antop Hill suburb of Mumbai, India. Lies on the Shaikh Mishree Marg.
There is demand for renaming Antop Hill monorail station to Shaikh Mishree Marg monorail station as it would become more relatable.

References

Mumbai Monorail stations
Railway stations in India opened in 2019